Erin Byrnes is an American politician and educator serving as a member of the Michigan House of Representatives for the 15th district. Elected in November 2022, she assumed office on January 1, 2023.

Early life and education 
Byrnes was born and raised in Dearborn, Michigan. She earned a Bachelor of Arts degree in women's and gender studies from the University of Michigan–Dearborn and a Master of Science in education from Brooklyn College.

Career 
From 2008 to 2010, Byrnes worked as a special education teacher in the New York City Department of Education. From 2012 to 2016, she was the director of the America Reads program at the University of Michigan. Since 2016, he has worked as an engagement lead at the University of Michigan. Byrnes served as a member of the Dearborn City Council from 2018 to 2021. She was elected to the Michigan House of Representatives in November 2022.

References 

Living people
Democratic Party members of the Michigan House of Representatives
Women state legislators in Michigan
Women city councillors in Michigan
People from Dearborn, Michigan
Politicians from Dearborn, Michigan
University of Michigan–Dearborn alumni
Brooklyn College alumni
University of Michigan people
21st-century American politicians
21st-century American women politicians
Year of birth missing (living people)